Horodok is an urban-type settlement in Zhytomyr Raion, Zhytomyr Oblast, Ukraine. Population: 

Horodok was granted urban-type settlement status on 16 August 2012.

References

Urban-type settlements in Zhytomyr Raion
Former closed cities
Zhytomyr Raion